Cameron Mooney (born 26 September 1979) is a former Australian rules footballer who played with the North Melbourne and Geelong Football Clubs in the Australian Football League (AFL).

Mooney was selected in the 2007 All-Australian Team, and was part of Geelong's AFL premiership-winning team in the same year. He also represented the Dream Team state team in the AFL Hall of Fame Tribute Match in 2008, as well as being the leading goalkicker for Geelong in 2007.

Early life
Mooney grew up in suburban Wagga Wagga with his brother Jason Mooney, attending Mount Austin High School in his teens. He began playing football with Turvey Park Football Club, later representing the NSW/ACT Rams in the TAC Cup before being taken by the Kangaroos with the 56th pick in the 1996 AFL Draft.

Career

1999: Kangaroos
Mooney made his AFL debut with the Kangaroos during round 7 of his first AFL season against the Adelaide Crows. That year, he was a member of the Kangaroos premiership team which defeated Carlton. However, he did not receive a single touch in this game and spent a large portion of the game on the bench.

2000: Trade to Geelong
At the end of 1999, Mooney was part of the trade which saw former Geelong captain, Leigh Colbert head to the Kangaroos, allowing Mooney to end up at Geelong. He was traded along with the 53rd and 67th selection in 1999 AFL Draft. This season also saw a Kangaroos assistant coach, Mark Thompson, take up the head coaching job at Geelong.

2004 – 2005
Following four unproductive years off the field, Mooney blossomed in 2004, subsequently catapulting Geelong to premiership contention. In 2005, Mooney's year was interrupted by injury. However, he destroyed Melbourne in the elimination final. The defining snapshot of Mooney's career was after the siren in the semi final against the Sydney Swans where Geelong lost by 3 points after Nick Davis goaled for Sydney with 2 seconds remaining giving the Swans their first and only lead of the entire game. Mooney was gutted by the result and was openly distressed and weeping.

2006: Suspensions
Mooney in 2006, after the heartache of 2005, experienced the relative joy of a pre-season premiership. However, his premiership season was not as fruitful. He was suspended, as well as his 100th game resulting in a loss. Geelong lost this game despite leading the West Coast Eagles by 54 points in the third quarter. Mooney was suspended on four separate occasions in 2006, leading to the club fining him week's wages. This lack of discipline was seen as detrimental to the team despite Mooney's good form. At the end of 2006 season Mooney also requested to be traded to another club, though he was convinced to stay at Geelong another year.

2007: Premiership glory
Playing permanently in the forward line for the first time, Mooney had an instrumental role as Geelong finished on top of the ladder at the end of the home and away season. Mooney topped the club goalkicking with 55 goals and was awarded with All-Australian selection for the first time. He is seen by some as the heart of the club due to his heart-on-sleeve attitude. Mooney capped off a remarkable season in 2007 kicking 5 goals in the premiership victory over Port Adelaide.

2008: Premiership heartbreak
Cameron Mooney's good form continued in 2008 season, he kicked 15 fewer goals though Geelong won 3 more games and kicked an extra 130 points.  Mooney's season turned from memorable to forgettable during the 2008 AFL Grand Final.

Mooney started the match well taking a few early marks and ended the first quarter with two goals including one from a difficult snap from the boundary line.  All this early good work fell to pieces at half time, when Mooney who seconds before the siren marked the ball about 5 metres out on a slight angle.  He too comfortably walked in to kick the goal and sprayed the ball to the left registering a behind, had he kicked a goal Geelong would have gone into half time with a 2-point lead instead of 3 points behind which they ultimately did.

The second half started just as it ended for Mooney another missed opportunity.  This time he was 30 metres out directly in front and missed another vital goal. 

Mooney finished the day with 2 goals 3 behinds from a total of 14 disposals, it was a disappointing day for himself and Geelong.

Retirement
After a series of injuries that kept him out of the team, Mooney announced his retirement at the end of the 2011 season.

Mooney made a one off guest appearance for the Glenorchy Football Club in the Tasmanian State League in 2012.

Since 2012, Mooney became a commentator on Fox Footy. He is also on Bounce with Jason Dunstall and Andrew Gaze.

Statistics

|-
|- style="background-color: #EAEAEA"
! scope="row" style="text-align:center;" | 1999
|style="text-align:center;"|
| 19 || 11 || 2 || 3 || 25 || 13 || 38 || 14 || 3 || 0.2 || 0.3 || 2.3 || 1.2 || 3.5 || 1.3 || 0.3
|-
! scope="row" style="text-align:center" | 2000
|style="text-align:center;"|
| 21 || 6 || 6 || 3 || 15 || 9 || 24 || 11 || 1 || 1.0 || 0.5 || 2.5 || 1.5 || 4.0 || 1.8 || 0.2
|- style="background-color: #EAEAEA"
! scope="row" style="text-align:center" | 2001
|style="text-align:center;"|
| 21 || 11 || 3 || 2 || 43 || 39 || 82 || 25 || 15 || 0.3 || 0.2 || 3.9 || 3.5 || 7.5 || 2.3 || 1.4
|-
! scope="row" style="text-align:center" | 2002
|style="text-align:center;"|
| 21 || 19 || 28 || 16 || 126 || 75 || 201 || 88 || 19 || 1.5 || 0.8 || 6.6 || 3.9 || 10.6 || 4.6 || 1.0
|- style="background-color: #EAEAEA"
! scope="row" style="text-align:center" | 2003
|style="text-align:center;"|
| 21 || 14 || 10 || 14 || 83 || 34 || 117 || 55 || 8 || 0.7 || 1.0 || 5.9 || 2.4 || 8.4 || 3.9 || 0.6
|-
! scope="row" style="text-align:center" | 2004
|style="text-align:center;"|
| 21 || 24 || 12 || 6 || 228 || 147 || 375 || 116 || 35 || 0.5 || 0.3 || 9.5 || 6.1 || 15.6 || 4.8 || 1.5
|- style="background-color: #EAEAEA"
! scope="row" style="text-align:center" | 2005
|style="text-align:center;"|
| 21 || 17 || 4 || 2 || 184 || 118 || 302 || 101 || 22 || 0.2 || 0.1 || 10.8 || 6.9 || 17.8 || 5.9 || 1.3
|-
! scope="row" style="text-align:center" | 2006
|style="text-align:center;"|
| 21 || 17 || 22 || 8 || 177 || 82 || 259 || 124 || 20 || 1.3 || 0.5 || 10.4 || 4.8 || 15.2 || 7.3 || 1.2
|- style="background-color: #EAEAEA"
! scope="row" style="text-align:center" | 2007
|style="text-align:center;"|
| 21 || 25 || 67 || 38 || 242 || 88 || 330 || 191 || 25 || 2.7 || 1.5 || 9.7 || 3.5 || 13.2 || 7.6 || 1.0
|-
! scope="row" style="text-align:center" | 2008
|style="text-align:center;"|
| 21 || 24 || 52 || 36 || 229 || 116 || 345 || 201 || 24 || 2.2 || 1.5 || 9.5 || 4.8 || 14.4 || 8.4 || 1.0
|- style="background-color: #EAEAEA"
! scope="row" style="text-align:center;" | 2009
|style="text-align:center;"|
| 21 || 24 || 46 || 42 || 224 || 97 || 321 || 178 || 28 || 1.9 || 1.8 || 9.3 || 4.0 || 13.4 || 7.4 || 1.2
|-
! scope="row" style="text-align:center" | 2010
|style="text-align:center;"|
| 21 || 21 || 36 || 30 || 182 || 72 || 254 || 131 || 32 || 1.7 || 1.4 || 8.7 || 3.4 || 12.1 || 6.2 || 1.5
|- style="background-color: #EAEAEA"
! scope="row" style="text-align:center" | 2011
|style="text-align:center;"|
| 21 || 8 || 9 || 8 || 57 || 51 || 108 || 36 || 17 || 1.1 || 1.0 || 7.1 || 6.4 || 13.5 || 4.5 || 2.1
|- class="sortbottom"
! colspan=3| Career
! 221
! 297
! 208
! 1815
! 941
! 2756
! 1271
! 249
! 1.3
! 0.9
! 8.2
! 4.3
! 12.5
! 5.8
! 1.1
|}

Honours and achievements

Team:
 AFL Premiership (North Melbourne): 1999
 AFL Premiership (Geelong): 2007, 2009
 AFL McClelland Trophy (Geelong): 2007, 2008
 AFL NAB Cup (Geelong): 2006

Individual:
 AFL:
 All-Australian: 2007
 Dream Team representative honours in the AFL Hall of Fame Tribute Match: 2008
 Geelong Football Club:
 Geelong F.C. "Coach's award": 2004
 Geelong F.C. "Community champion" award: 2006
 Geelong F.C. "Leading goalkicker" award: 2007, 2009

Milestones:
 North Melbourne:
 AFL/North Melbourne debut: Round 7, 1999 (vs. ) at the Melbourne Cricket Ground (North Melbourne won by 56 points)
 Finals debut: Qualifying final, 1999 (vs. ) at the Melbourne Cricket Ground (North Melbourne won by 44 points)
 Geelong:
 Geelong debut: Round 17, 2000 (vs. ) at the Telstra Dome (Geelong lost by 24 points)
 50th AFL game: Round 4, 2003 (vs. ) at Skilled Stadium (Geelong won by 46 points)
 50th Geelong game: Round 20, 2003 (vs. ) at Skilled Stadium (Geelong drew with West Coast)
 100th AFL game: Round 22, 2005 (vs. ) at Skilled Stadium (Geelong won by 1 point)
 100th Geelong game: Round 10, 2006 (vs. ) at Skilled Stadium (Geelong lost by 3 points after leading by 54 points in the 3rd qtr.)
 150th AFL game: Round 6, 2008 (vs. ) at Subiaco Oval (Geelong won by 1 point)
 150th Geelong game: Round 18, 2008 (vs. ) at Telstra Dome (Geelong won by 63 points)

Tribunal history

References

External links

 
 

1979 births
Living people
Australian rules footballers from New South Wales
NSW/ACT Rams players
North Melbourne Football Club players
North Melbourne Football Club Premiership players
Geelong Football Club players
Geelong Football Club Premiership players
All-Australians (AFL)
Glenorchy Football Club players
Three-time VFL/AFL Premiership players
Sportspeople from Wagga Wagga